2011–12 Hong Kong Senior Challenge Shield is the 110th season of one of the Asian oldest football knockout competitions, Hong Kong Senior Challenge Shield. Starting from this season, the format will change into a two-legged home-and-away ties competition. The winner Sunray Cave JC Sun Hei has guaranteed a place in the 2013 AFC Cup.

Calendar

Bracket
The following bracket doesn't show first round matches.

Match Records

First round

Quarter-finals

Semi-finals

Final

MATCH OFFICIALS
Assistant referees:
Chow Chun Kit
Chung Ming Sang
Fourth official: Tong Kui Sum

MATCH RULES
90 minutes.
30 minutes of extra-time if necessary.
Penalty shoot-out if scores still level.
Seven named substitutes
Maximum of 3 substitutions.

Scorers
The scorers in the 2011–12 Hong Kong Senior Challenge Shield are as follows:

4 goals
  Itaparica (TSW Pegasus)

3 goals

  Milutin Trnavać (Tuen Mun)
  Jaimes McKee (TSW Pegasus)

2 goals

  Chan Siu Ki (South China)
  Wilfred Bamnjo (Tuen Mun)
  Mamadou Barry (Sunray Cave JC Sun Hei)
  Cheng Siu Wai (Sunray Cave JC Sun Hei)

1 goal

  Xu Deshuai (South China)
  Au Yeung Yiu Chung (South China)
  Ng Wai Chiu (South China)
  Joel (South China)
  Chan Wai Ho (South China)
  Hélio (Citizen)
  Detinho (Citizen)
  Paulinho Piracicaba (Citizen)
  Jordi Tarrés (Kitchee)
  Chen Liming (Wofoo Tai Po)
  Christian Annan (Wofoo Tai Po)
  Lo Kong Wai (Sham Shui Po)
  Fong Pak Lun (Sham Shui Po)
  Ling Cong (Tuen Mun)
  Chan Hin Kwong (Tuen Mun)
  Chow Cheuk Fung (Tuen Mun)
  Makhosonke Bhengu (Tuen Mun)
  Lucas (TSW Pegasus)
  Li Ka Chun (TSW Pegasus)
  Cheung Kin Fung (TSW Pegasus)
  Lee Hong Lim (TSW Pegasus)
  Lau Ka Shing (TSW Pegasus)
  Leandro Carrijó (TSW Pegasus)
  Dane Milovanovic (Sunray Cave JC Sun Hei)
  Jean-Jacques Kilama (Sunray Cave JC Sun Hei)
  Wong Chun Yue (Sunray Cave JC Sun Hei)
  Leung Tsz Chun (Sunray Cave JC Sun Hei)

Prizes

External links
 Senior Shield - Hong Kong Football Association

2010-11
Shiled
2011–12 domestic association football cups